Eric MacDonald (22 November 1900 – 17 February 1967) was a British diver. He competed in two events at the 1924 Summer Olympics.

References

External links
 

1900 births
1967 deaths
British male divers
Olympic divers of Great Britain
Divers at the 1924 Summer Olympics
Place of birth missing